Bernt Christian Birkeland (born 16 July 1974) is a Norwegian former footballer who played as a midfielder.

Career

Birkeland started his career with Norwegian side Start, where he made 42 league appearances and scored 1 goal. On 17 April 1994, Birkeland debuted for Start during a 0–2 loss to Rosenborg. On 21 April 1996, he scored his first goal for Start during a 3–3 draw with Bodø/Glimt. In 1999,  Birkeland signed for Marsala in the Italian third tier after trialing for Portuguese top flight club Boavista and Aberdeen in the Scottish top flight. Before the 2000 season, he signed for Norwegian second tier team Kongsvinger.

References

External links

 

1974 births
Association football midfielders
Eliteserien players
Expatriate footballers in Italy
IK Start players
Kongsvinger IL Toppfotball players
Living people
Norwegian expatriate footballers
Norwegian expatriate sportspeople in Italy
Norwegian First Division players
Norwegian footballers
Serie C players
Skeid Fotball players
People from Kristiansand